There are two species of snake named painted keelback:

 Xenochrophis cerasogaster, found in Pakistan, Nepal, Bangladesh, and India
 Tropidonophis picturatus, found in Indonesia